Poirier is a French surname, meaning pear tree (cf. poire).

Those bearing this surname include:
 Anne and Patrick Poirier, French artists
 Dustin Poirier, an Acadian-American professional mixed martial arts fighter
 Claude Poirier, a French-Canadian television journalist
 Denise Poirier, an American voice actress
 Denise Poirier-Rivard, a French-Canadian politician from Quebec
 Dominique Poirier, a French-Canadian journalist and diplomat
 Ghislain Poirier, a French-Canadian DJ and record producer
 Gregory Poirier, an American film and television writer, director, and producer
 Jean Poirier, a Canadian politician from Ontario
 Kim Poirier, a French-Canadian actress, singer, film producer, and television host
 Luc Poirier, a French-Canadian professional wrestler known as Rambo
 Lyne Poirier, a French-Canadian Olympic judoka
 Manuel Poirier, a French film director
 Mark Poirier, an American novelist and screenwriter
 Narcisse Poirier, a French-Canadian artist
 Normand Poirier, an American writer of French-Canadian descent
 Pascal Poirier, a French-Canadian author, lawyer, and politician from New Brunswick
 Paul Poirier, a Canadian ice dancer
 Richard Poirier, an American literary critic
 Rose-May Poirier, a French-Canadian politician from New Brunswick
 Vincent Poirier, a French professional basketball player

See also
 Poitier
 Poirier's_Diner, a historic restaurant in Providence, Rhode Island

French-language surnames